Sveti Nikole is a municipality in eastern Macedonia. Sveti Nikole is also the name of the town where the municipal seat is found. Sveti Nikole Municipality is part of the Vardar Statistical Region.

Geography 
The municipality borders Kumanovo Municipality and Kratovo Municipality to the north, Probištip Municipality to the east, Štip Municipality and Lozovo Municipality to the south, Veles Municipality and Petrovec Municipality to the west.

Demographics 
Sveti Nikole Municipality has 18,497 residents, according to the 2002 Macedonian census. Ethnic groups in the municipality:
 Macedonians = 18,005 (97.3%)
 Vlachs = 238 (1.3%)
 others.

Inhabited places

References

External links 
 

 
Vardar Statistical Region
Municipalities of North Macedonia